Person(a) is a full-length studio album by Norman Iceberg. Recorded and mixed at Marko Studios in Montreal, it was released in 1987. The musical style of the album is a blend of experimental electronic music and commercial synthpop, and featured keyboardists such as Lenny Pinkas (Men Without Hats), Mario Spezza (Rational Youth) and Mic Lussier. The lyrics contain references to androgyny.

Two singles were released from the album. Initially released on LP and cassette, Person(a) was never re-released on CD, making it now a rare collector's item.

Track listing
 "Gotta Move" (N. Iceberg, M.H. Klein) – 5:48
 "Crawl" (N. Iceberg) – 4:41
 "Be My Human Tonight" (N. Iceberg, M.H. Klein, D. Edmead) – 5:28
 "(Dont Be So) Cold" (N. Iceberg, M. Spezza) – 5:03
 "All My Life" (N. Iceberg, L. Tremblay) – 5:30
 "His Own Story" (N. Iceberg, A. Fecteau) – 5:00
 "I Am : I Can" (N. Iceberg) – 0:54

Personnel
 Norman Iceberg – Lead and Back Vocals, Synthesizers 
 Martin H. Klein – Synthesizers, Drum Programming and Piano
 Dave Edmead – Synthesizers, Drum Programming and Sequencer Programming  
 Roberto Coriandoli – Synthesizers
 Lenny Pinkas – Emulator Programming
 Alain Simard – Emulator Programming
 Denis Samson - Sequencer Programming on “Be My Human Tonight”
 Mario Spezza assisted by Michel Lussier – Moog Programming
 François Lalonde – Drum Programming and Percussion
 John Rudel – Percussion on "His Own Story"
 Joe Jammer – Electric Guitar on “Be My Human Tonight”

Singles
 "Be My Human Tonight"
 "Gotta Move"

External links
 Library and Archives Canada
 Person(a) on Discogs.

Person(a)